Fateh Jang (Punjabi and ) is a city in Attock District of Punjab Province, Pakistan.

Overview
The city is located in between Kala Chitta Range and Khairi Murat Range. The New Islamabad International Airport, the largest airport of Pakistan,  is located near the city. Cadet College Fateh Jang is the leading educational institute in Fateh Jung while Fatehjang railway station is one of the important railway station in Attock.it is about 50KM away from Jund City which is the last tehsil of Attock District in Punjab after which the KPK Province starts.

References

Cities and towns in Attock District